The Uganda men's national field hockey team represents Uganda in men's international field hockey competitions and is controlled by the Uganda Hockey Association, the governing body for field hockey in Uganda.

Uganda has participated once at the Summer Olympics in 1972 when they finished 15th.

Tournament record

Summer Olympics
1972 – 15th

Africa Cup of Nations
1974 – 
2000 – 7th
 2022 – 6th

African Games
 2023 – Qualified

African Olympic Qualifier
2007 – 6th
2019 – Withdrew

See also
Uganda women's national field hockey team

References

African men's national field hockey teams
National team
Field hockey